Bath Historic District is a historic district in Bath, Beaufort County, North Carolina.  The district is now a North Carolina Historic Site belonging to the North Carolina Department of Natural and Cultural Resources and known as Historic Bath, and includes a visitor center offering guided tours of the Bonner House and Palmer-Marsh House, which is also a National Historic Landmark.  Visitors can also tour the Van der Veer House and St. Thomas Episcopal Church.

It was listed on the National Register of Historic Places in 1970.

References

External links
 Historic Bath - North Carolina Historic Sites

Historic districts on the National Register of Historic Places in North Carolina
Buildings and structures in Beaufort County, North Carolina
Museums in Beaufort County, North Carolina
North Carolina State Historic Sites
National Register of Historic Places in Beaufort County, North Carolina
Open-air museums in North Carolina